McLoughlins Beach is a small settlement in South Gippsland, Victoria. It has an estimated permanent population of less than 300 and a number of holiday houses.

History
The first inhabitants of the broader area were the Kurnai Aboriginal people. Within the Kurnai people were the Brataulung people who inhabited the forests and coasts around McLoughlins Beach area for thousands of years. They used the waterways as a source of fish and shellfish. Like other nearby coastal towns, McLoughlins Beach is thought have Aboriginal heritage values of significance, although comprehensive studies of the area in this regard have been limited.

European development of the area began in the early 1920s when the original jetty was built. This jetty existed until the 1960s. During this time McLoughlins Beach was a popular fishing village. The current jetty was built in 1967 and the footbridge which gives access to Ninety Mile Beach was built in 1972.

The current mayor of McLoughlins Beach is Elijah Kerrison-Male. He was popular among residents for his policies which involved building a 'wall' to keep the sharks out of the bay, as well as erecting new fencing around the houses of residents whom he viewed as unfavourable and unsightly. On 10 October, he deemed local elections to be 'undemocratic', thus concreting his place as the beach's effective dictator. Alongside his pug, Harry, Kerrison-Male rules the shores. His residents are very grateful, it can be assured. Kerrison-Male has strong ties with Seamus Doyle, Mayor of Jack River, and Jackson O' Loughlin, lab rat activist and longtime husband of 80's arcade game, 'Crazy Balloon'.

Recreation
McLoughlins Beach provides opportunities for estuary, offshore and surf fishing. Facilities that assist with fishing include a boat ramp, a jetty and a footbridge that provides walking access to Ninety Mile Beach. Recreational fishing is popular in both the inlet and from the surf, and frequently caught species include the gummy shark, snapper, flathead, and silver trevally. Local authorities do not recommend swimming at Ninety Mile Beach here although surfers and swimmers can generally be found here in the summer months. Nearby Woodside Beach is more popular for families, as there are surf lifesavers present during the summer months. Walks in the area include a one kilometre return walk along the jetty and boardwalk and a 20 kilometre return walk from McLoughlins Point to Reeves Beach.
McLoughlins Beach also has a picnic shelter, playground, public toilets, postal box and public telephone.

Environment
Located near the western end point of Ninety Mile Beach McLoughlins Beach sits on a slight elevation largely surrounded by waterways and mud flats.

Next to and partly surrounding the township is the 73,600 acre (29,800 ha) Nooramunga Marine and Coastal Park. This park has a number of threatened species including the little tern, the white-bellied sea eagle, Lewin's rail, ground parrot (Pezoporus wallicus), swamp skink (Egernia coventryi) and the great egret.

See also
 Wilsons Promontory Marine National Park

References

Towns in Victoria (Australia)
Shire of Wellington